Dejan Stamenković may refer to:

Dejan Stamenković (footballer, born 1983), Serbian association football player who plays for Kolubara
Dejan Stamenković (footballer, born 1990), Serbian association football player